Akande is both a surname and a given name of Yoruba origin. Notable people with the name include:

Adebisi Akande (born 1957), Nigerian politician
Alex Tayo Akande (born 1989), Hong Kong footballer
Laolu Akande, Nigerian journalist, editor, scholar and lecturer
Nike Akande (born October 29, 1944), Nigerian industrialist
Zanana Akande (born 1937), Canadian politician
Akande Ajide (born 1985), Nigerian footballer
Wahab Adekola Akande (born 1967), Nigerian diplomat

Yoruba-language surnames
Yoruba given names